The 2018–19 Liga III was the 63rd season of Liga III, the third tier of the Romanian football league system. The season began on 24 August 2018 and ended on 25 May 2019.

Team changes

To Liga III
Promoted from Liga IV
 1. FC Gloria  (debut)
 Bragadiru  (debut)
 Ceahlăul Piatra Neamț  (after 38 years of absence)
 Crișul Chișineu-Criș  (after 26 years of absence)
 Dumbrăvița  (debut)
 Făurei  (after 12 years of absence)
 FC U Craiova  (debut)
 Flacăra Horezu  (after 17 years of absence)
 SCM Gloria Buzău  (debut)
 Hunedoara  (after 2 years of absence)
 Medgidia  (after 8 years of absence)
 Minaur Baia Mare  (after 3 years of absence)
 MSE Târgu Mureș  (debut)
 Ocna Mureș  (after 11 years of absence)
 Rapid București  (debut)
 SR Brașov  (debut)
 Sticla Arieșul Turda  (after 4 years of absence)
 Șomuz Fălticeni  (debut)
 Unirea Bascov  (debut)

Relegated from Liga II
 Afumați  (after 2 years of absence)
 Știința Miroslava  (after 1 year of absence)
 Foresta Suceava  (after 6 years of absence)

From Liga III
Relegated to Liga IV
 Internațional Bălești  (ended 1-year stay)
 Avântul Valea Mărului  (ended 2-year stay)
 Victoria Traian  (ended 1-year stay)
 Urban Titu  (ended 11-year stay)
 Nuova Mama Mia Becicherecu Mic  (ended 5-year stay)
 Viitorul Ghimbav  (ended 1-year stay)
 Metalosport Galați  (ended 4-year stay)

Promoted to Liga II
 Aerostar Bacău  (ended 19-year stay)
 Farul Constanța  (ended 1-year stay)
 Petrolul Ploiești  (ended 1-year stay)
 Șirineasa  (ended 2-year stay)
 Universitatea Cluj  (ended 1-year stay)

Excluded teams
After the end of the previous season, Târgu Mureș and Olimpia Satu Mare were dissolved.

Concordia II Chiajna and Mioveni II withdrew from Liga III.

Venus Independența withdrew due to financial problems.

Performanța Ighiu withdrew due to financial problems.

Gauss Bacău withdrew due to financial problems.

Teams spared from relegation
Metaloglobus București was spared from relegation to Liga III due to withdrawal of Afumați.

Sportul Chiscani, Pașcani, Iernut, Viitorul Domnești, Delta Dobrogea Tulcea and Unirea Dej and were spared from relegation to Liga IV due to lack of teams in the Liga III.

Other teams
Afumați withdrew from Liga II after the end of the last season and was enrolled instead in the Liga III, a move made due to financial reasons.

Reserve team of FC Botoșani was enrolled in the championship instead of Gauss Bacău which withdrew due to financial problems.

Renamed teams
ACS Dumitra moved from Dumitra to Bistrița and changed the club's name to  1. FC Gloria. The club would like to be considered the successor of ACF Gloria Bistrița, but it does not own its brand and record yet.

FC Aninoasa moved from Aninoasa to Pucioasa and changed its name to FC Pucioasa.

FCM Alexandria was renamed as CSM Alexandria.

ACS Ghiroda was renamed as CSC Ghiroda.

Voința Turnu Măgurele was renamed as Turris-Oltul Turnu Măgurele.

League tables

Seria I

Seria II

Seria III

Seria IV

Seria V

Possible relegation
At the end of the season, a special table was made between 12th places from the 5 series. The last team in this table was also relegated in the Liga IV. In this table, 12th place teams are included without the points obtained against teams that relegated in their series.

References

2018
3
Romania